Calytrix amethystina is a species of flowering plant of the family Myrtaceae.

It blooms between July and September producing blue-purple-white star shaped flowers.

Found amongst rocky outcrops and on breakaways in inland parts of the Mid West and western parts of the Goldfields-Esperance regions of Western Australia where it grows on shallow rocky soils over sandstone or laterite.

References

External links

Plants described in 1987
amethystina